The Koenigsegg CC850 is a limited production mid-engine sports car manufactured by Swedish automobile manufacturer Koenigsegg. It was unveiled on the 19th of August 2022 at Pebble Beach, California, as a homage to the CC8S. Built to commemorate the 20th anniversary of the first production CC8S, the CC850 was originally limited to 50 units to celebrate the company's founder Christian von Koenigsegg's 50th birthday, however, due to increased demand it was announced six days later on the 25th of August 2022 that an additional 20 units would be built.

Specifications
Despite the shared name, the CC850 does not share any components with the original CC8S and is instead based on the Koenigsegg Jesko. Similar to the Jesko, the CC850 shares the same multilink front and rear suspension, which consists of double wishbones, hydraulic and gas-hydraulic shock absorbers, with Triplex dampers at the rear. Steering is rack and pinion, with Koenigsegg's proprietary 9-speed Light Speed Transmission sends power to the rear wheels. The CC850 also has a feature called the Engage Shifter System, which allows the driver to simulate six gears of manual shifting with a physical clutch pedal as opposed to paddle shifters. Christian von Koenigsegg claims that with this feature the CC850 "must be the fastest manual car around a racetrack I can think of". Peak torque stands at  @ 4,800 rpm. The forged aluminium wheels (20" x 9.5" front, 21" 12.25" rear) are shod in Michelin Pilot Sport 4S (265/35R-20 front, and 325/30R-21 rear). Stopping power is provided by a set of  6-piston calipers on the front wheels and  4-piston calipers on the rear.

References

Koenigsegg vehicles
Rear mid-engine, rear-wheel-drive vehicles
Sports cars
Cars introduced in 2022
Flexible-fuel vehicles